The Lehr und Wehr Verein ("Educational and Defense Society") was a socialist military organization founded in 1875, in Chicago, Illinois. The group had been formed to counter the armed private armies of companies in Chicago.

The Lehr und Wehr Verein (LWV) was registered with the Illinois state authorities on April 19, 1875, with about 30 Bohemian  and German members. The LWV trained and drilled in anticipation of an envisaged confrontation between Capital and Labor.

In 1879 the State Legislature passed an act establishing a state militia and obliging all other militias to obtain a license from the Governor. That December, the LWV paraded 40 strong, armed with rifles. They were headed by Herman Presser, a socialist worker armed with a saber. Presser was arrested, as the organization had no license.

Lawyers for the LWV argued that the new law breached the Second Amendment to the United States Constitution. Presser v. Illinois became a test case which proceeded through the criminal courts, to the Illinois Supreme Court, and to the Supreme Court of the United States. In each court Presser's conviction was upheld.  The LWV never again paraded in public.

References

Further reading

 Heiss, Christine. Der Lehr- und Wehr-Verein von Chicago, 1875-1887: Ein sozialgeschichtlichter Beitrag zur Radikalisierung deutscher Arbeiter in den USA ("The Lehr und Wehr Verein: A social history of its contribution to the radicalization of German workers in the USA"). Master's dissertation. Munich: Ludwig-Maximilians University, 1981.
 LeBlanc, Paul. "Revolutionary Socialism in America, 1877-1887." Master's seminar paper. Pittsburgh: University of Pittsburgh, 1979.

See also

 Philip Van Patten

History of socialism
Left-wing militant groups in the United States
Socialist Labor Party of America
Organizations based in Chicago
German-American organizations
1875 establishments in Illinois